Prisoners of Love is a 1954 West German drama film directed by Rudolf Jugert and starring Curd Jürgens, Annemarie Düringer and Bernhard Wicki. It revolves around the story of a married couple separated by the Second World War.

It was shot at the Bavaria Studios in Munich. The film's sets were designed by the art director Erich Kettelhut and Johannes Ott.

Main cast
 Curd Jürgens as Willi Kluge
 Annemarie Düringer as Maria, seine Frau
 Bernhard Wicki as Franz Martens
 Mady Rahl as Anni
 Paul Esser as Max
 Brigitte Horney as Dr. Hildegard Thomas
 Claire Reigbert as Ihre Mutter
 Gabriele Strasser as Christine, das Kind
 Fritz Benscher as Ludwig
 Til Kiwe as Heinz
 Ingeborg Thiede as Rita
 Herbert Kroll as Karl
 Ruth von Zerboni as Hanne, seine Frau
 Jürgen Micksch as Richard, 10jähriger Sohn
 Agnes Fink as Paula Scheftschick
 Heinz-Leo Fischer as Ansager der Todesbahn
 Alfons Teuber as Ansager der orientalischen Nächte
 Franz Fröhlich as Ansager am Lukas

References

Bibliography
 Robert G. Moeller. War Stories: The Search for a Usable Past in the Federal Republic of Germany. University of California Press, 2001.

External links 
 

1954 films
1954 drama films
German drama films
West German films
1950s German-language films
Films directed by Rudolf Jugert
Films shot at Bavaria Studios
German black-and-white films
1950s German films